During the 2010–11 Dutch football season, PSV Eindhoven competed in the Eredivisie, KNVB Cup, and UEFA Europa League.

Season summary
In the league, PSV repeated last season's third-place finish, securing a spot in the play-off round of next season's UEFA Europa League.

Players

First-team squad
Squad at end of season

Left club during season

Jong PSV

Results

References

Notes

PSV Eindhoven seasons
PSV Eindhoven
PSV Eindhoven